Faith is the third album by the American group Basehead, released in 1996. The release was delayed for two years as Imago Records separated from BMG. It was the group's last album for the label.

Production
The album was recorded in 1994 at Pachyderm Recording Studio, in Minnesota, with engineering help from Michael Koppelman; Koppelman and DJ Clarence Greenwood also coproduced some of the tracks. The lyrics, written by Michael Ivey, address themes of Christian spirituality and God.

Critical reception

Entertainment Weekly deemed the album " avant-Christian funk," writing that Ivey "hasn’t curtailed his humor, his drawling sensuality, or his sense of musical adventure." The Washington City Paper advised: "Imagine a mellow Prince quietly declaiming over the late-night vibes of a cafe ensemble comfortable with jazz balladry, triphop, sadcore, and cutting-edge hiphop." The Orange County Register called it "a brilliant blend of social observation, lo-fi hip-hop, twisted jazz, clever avant-rock, and smart old school that cuts very, very deep."

CMJ New Music Monthly thought that "some songs lilt and others throb, but Faith still has the arid, rustic sound that distinguishes Basehead's records from any others in hip-hop." The Fort Worth Star-Telegram determined that Ivey's "spiritual lyrics have matured without getting pompous," writing that the frontman is "the guy who pretty much founded that whole 'alternative rap' movement—a commingling of rap, reggae, country and R&B that Arrested Development, the Fugees and others swiped and made nice careers out of—and still he lingers in the shadows of obscurity."

AllMusic wrote that Ivey "didn't leave behind his trademark amalgam of funk, hip-hop, and kitschy pop but he has become more focused ... Unfortunately, you don't listen to Basehead to hear direction—Ivey's charm has always been in his fragmented, hazy cut-and-paste approach."

Track listing

References

Basehead albums
1996 albums
Imago Records albums